Hingna Assembly constituency is one of the twelve constituencies of the Maharashtra Vidhan Sabha located in the Nagpur district.

It is a part of the Ramtek (Lok Sabha constituency) (SC) from the Nagpur district.

Sameer Meghe, BJP represents the constituency in the 13th Maharashtra Legislative Assembly.

Members of Legislative Assembly

See also
Hingna

References

Assembly constituencies of Nagpur district
Assembly constituencies of Maharashtra